Vangos is a village in the municipality of Megalopoli, Arcadia, Greece. It is situated in the southwestern foothills of the Mainalo mountains, at about 800 m elevation. It is 2 km southeast of Karatoulas, 4 km east of Trilofo, 6 km northwest of Kerastaris and 8 km northeast of Megalopoli. Vangos had a population of 47 in 2011.

Population

See also
List of settlements in Arcadia

References

External links
History and information about Vangos
 Vangos GTP Travel Pages

Megalopolis, Greece
Populated places in Arcadia, Peloponnese